Cecilia is a female name.

Cecilia may also refer to:

Books
Cecilia (Burney novel), an 18th-century work by Frances Burney
Cecilia (McClure novel), a 1993 novel by Julie McClure

Films
Cecilia (1954 film), a Norwegian film
Cecilia (1982 film), a Cuban film

Geography
Cecilia, Table Mountain, a section of the Table Mountain National Park, Cape Town, South Africa
Cecilia Island, the South Shetland Islands, Antarctica 
Cecilia, Kentucky, an unincorporated community in the United States
Cecilia, Louisiana, a small census-designated place in the United States
Santa Cecilia, a municipality in Spain
Santa Cecilia del Alcor, a municipality in Spain 
Santa Cecilia in Trastevere, a 5th-century church in Rome

Music
Cecilian Movement, a movement of church reform centered in Italy around 1900
Cecilia (band), an American pop-rock band based in New York
Cecilia, an opera by Licinio Refice
Boston Cecilia, a choral society based in Boston, Massachusetts

Songs
'"Cäcilie" (Strauss), a 1894 song by Richard Strauss
"Cecilia" (Ace of Base song), a 1999 song 
"Cecilia" (Dreyer and Ruby song), a 1926 song written by Dave Dreyer with lyrics by Harry Ruby
"Cecilia" (Simon & Garfunkel song), a 1970 song
"Oh Cecilia" (Breaking My Heart), a 2014 song
"Cecilia and the Satellite", a 2014 song
"Cecilia", a Brett Kissel song from the 2017 album We Were That Song

Other uses
Caecilian, a Group (order) of amphibians
Tropical Cyclone Cecilia (1993)

See also